Zutragum is a genus of moths of the family Noctuidae.

Species
Zutragum likianga Draudt, 1950

References
Natural History Museum Lepidoptera genus database

Cuculliinae